The Wave (French: La Vague) is an 1888 painting by Paul Gauguin. It was purchased by David Rockefeller, an American banking executive, in 1966.

It was owned by the Paris-based American writer Alden Brooks by 1934, and later gifted to Filippa Brooks Veren of Big Sur, California, who sold it at auction at the Parke-Bernet Galleries, New York, on 19 May 1966, where it was bought by David Rockefeller.

References

Paintings by Paul Gauguin
1888 paintings
Water in art